DSSI may refer to:

 Digital Storage Systems Interconnect
 Disposable Soft Synth Interface
 German School Seoul International (Deutsche Schule Seoul International)